Chris Schreuder (born 24 January 1999) is a South African rugby union player for the  in the Currie Cup and . His regular position is fly-half.

Schreuder was named in the  squad for the 2021 Currie Cup Premier Division.

References

South African rugby union players
Living people
1999 births
Rugby union fly-halves
Western Province (rugby union) players
Stormers players